The 8th European Parliament was elected across the European Union in the late days of May 2014 for the 2014–2019 session. The United Kingdom was apportioned to send 73 out of the 751 Member of the European Parliament (MEPs) that are listed below.

Contribution of UK political parties within European Parliament political groups
The UK had representation with 73 of the 751 seats of the European Parliament with party contributions within political groups as follows at time of dissolution:

Members at dissolution
This table can be sorted by constituency, party or party group: click the symbol at the top of the appropriate column.

Former members

Notes

References

See also
 2014 European Parliament election in the United Kingdom
 2014 European Parliament election
 Parliamentary Groups

External links
European elections: UK results

2014
List
United Kingdom